Huffman is a Bohemian American surname likely derived from the German surname "Hoffman". 

Notable people with the surname include:

Alaina Huffman (born 1980), Canadian actress
Berl Huffman (1907–1990), American college sports coach
Booker Huffman (born 1965), American professional wrestler better known as Booker T
Cady Huffman (born 1965), American actress
Dave Huffman, former NFL player
David Huffman, American actor
David Huffman (artist), contemporary American artist
David A. Huffman, creator of Huffman coding
Donald Huffman, American physicist
Felicity Huffman (born 1962), American actress
George Huffman (1862–1897), American businessman
James W. Huffman, United States Senator from Ohio (1945–1946)
Jared Huffman, United States Representative from California (2013–present)
Jim Huffman, law professor and candidate for United States Senate from Oregon
John W. Huffman, professor emeritus of organic chemistry at Clemson University who first synthesised many novel cannabinoids
Kathy Rae Huffman, art curator for video art, new media art, online and interactive art, based in California, USA.
Kurt Huffman, American politician
Lash Huffman (born 1960), American professional wrestler better known as Stevie Ray; brother of Booker T
Laton Alton Huffman (1854–1931) was an American photographer of Frontier and Native American life
Maven Huffman (born 1976), American professional wrestler often known by his first name only
Nate Huffman (1975–2015), American basketball player, 2001 Israeli Basketball Premier League MVP
Robert Huffman (born 1968), former American stock car racing driver
Robert E. Huffman, American scientist and author
Rosanna Huffman, American actress
Scott Huffman (born 1964), American pole-vaulting champion
Shirley Huffman (1928–2018), American politician
Steve Huffman, CEO of Reddit

German-language surnames